El Sobrante (Spanish for "The Surplus", is a census-designated place (CDP) in Contra Costa County, California, United States. The population was 12,669 at the 2010 census.

Geography

El Sobrante is unincorporated and lies within Contra Costa County.  Main roads include San Pablo Dam Road (a major road running from Richmond and San Pablo, through El Sobrante, past EBMUD's San Pablo Reservoir), Valley View Road and Appian Way. San Pablo Dam Road and Appian Way both connect to Interstate 80 to the west.

El Sobrante also contains San Pablo Creek, running behind the library.

History

Between 5000 and 1000 BC, an indigenous tribe of people called the Huichin, an Ohlone people, came to the East Bay, including El Sobrante. One of the Huichin villages was located where the El Sobrante Library now stands. The Huichin left a now-buried shell mound beside San Pablo Creek.  Ohlone people still live in the bay area and other parts of the world today.

Between November 1794 and May 1795, the Huichin were forcibly converted to Christianity by Spanish missionaries.  After all of the Huichin were removed to Mission San Francisco, they suffered an epidemic of European diseases as well as food shortages, and died in great numbers, resulting in alarming statistics of death and escapes from the missions. In pursuing the runaways, the Franciscans sent neophytes first and (as a last resort) soldiers to go round up the runaway "Christians" from their relatives, and bring them back to the missions. Thus illness spread both inside and outside of the missions.

After Mexican independence from Spain in the early 19th century, Spanish colonists were given land grants, one of which was Rancho El Sobrante, deeded to Juan Jose and Víctor Castro in 1841. The grant's boundaries were unusually complicated, as they were to be determined by the boundaries of the surrounding grants: San Antonio, San Pablo, El Pinole, Boca de la Cañada del Pinole, Acalanes, and La Laguna de los Palos Colorados. In this sense, the rancho was el sobrante, the remaining area. Legal disputes concerning the borders and the claims of squatters continued for four decades, with much of the land sold to pay court and attorney costs. He built an adobe dwelling in what is now El Cerrito, and became one of the first members of the Board of Supervisors of Contra Costa County. Castro died at the age of 90 in 1897. Some of his descendants still live in the area of Castro Ranch Road.

El Sobrante was called "Oak Grove" by industrial concerns in 1887 when the California and Nevada Railroad put a spur into the area for the purpose of carrying lumber cut from the hills. Then the name Sobrante was applied, with the addition of the Spanish definite article "El" coinciding with the opening of the first post office in 1941.

By the early 20th century, Rancho El Sobrante had been reduced to a number of smaller ranches, generally following a dirt road along San Pablo Creek. Many of these ranches were further subdivided. As roads were paved and homes were constructed, El Sobrante changed from a rural to a semi-rural community.

Demographics

2020 

The 2020 United States Census reported that El Sobrante had a population of 15,524. The racial makeup of El Sobrante is 5,545 White, 2,603 from other races, 2,252 from two or more races, 2,915 Asian, 1,817 African American, 292 Native American, and 100 Pacific Islander. Hispanic or Latino of any race were 4,646 persons.

2010
The 2010 United States Census reported that El Sobrante had a population of 12,669. The racial makeup of El Sobrante was 6,405 (50.6%) White, 1,673 (13.2%) African American, 127 (1.0%) Native American, 1,986 (15.7%) Asian, 113 (0.9%) Pacific Islander, 1,384 (10.9%) from other races, and 981 (7.7%) from two or more races. Hispanic or Latino of any race were 3,036 persons (24.0%).

The Census reported that 12,620 people (99.6% of the population) lived in households, 49 (0.4%) lived in non-institutionalized group quarters, and 0 (0%) were institutionalized.

There were 4,759 households, out of which 1,600 (33.6%) had children under the age of 18 living in them, 2,154 (45.3%) were opposite-sex married couples living together, 757 (15.9%) had a female householder with no husband present, 301 (6.3%) had a male householder with no wife present.  There were 312 (6.6%) unmarried opposite-sex partnerships, and 67 (1.4%) same-sex married couples or partnerships. 1,170 households (24.6%) were made up of individuals, and 373 (7.8%) had someone living alone who was 65 years of age or older. The average household size was 2.65.  There were 3,212 families (67.5% of all households); the average family size was 3.16.

The population was spread out, with 2,696 people (21.3%) under the age of 18, 1,126 people (8.9%) aged 18 to 24, 3,340 people (26.4%) aged 25 to 44, 3,910 people (30.9%) aged 45 to 64, and 1,597 people (12.6%) who were 65 years of age or older.  The median age was 40.6 years. For every 100 females, there were 95.1 males.  For every 100 females age 18 and over, there were 94.0 males.

The homeowner vacancy rate was 2.0%; the rental vacancy rate was 7.2%.  7,829 people (61.8% of the population) lived in owner-occupied housing units and 4,791 people (37.8%) lived in rental housing units.

2000
As of the 2000 census, there were 12,260 people, 4,676 households, and 3,170 families residing in the CDP. The racial makeup of the CDP was 60.35% White, 12.16% Black or African American, 0.67% Native American, 12.50% Asian, 0.29% Pacific Islander, 6.97% from other races, and 7.06% from two or more races.  15.58% of the population were Hispanic or Latino of any race.

There were 4,676 households, out of which 32.6% had children under the age of 18 living with them, 47.6% were married couples living together, 14.8% had a female householder with no husband present, and 32.2% were non-families. 24.6% of all households were made up of individuals, and 8.3% had someone living alone who was 65 years of age or older.  The average household size was 2.61 and the average family size was 3.11.

In the CDP, the population was spread out, with 24.7% under the age of 18, 7.3% from 18 to 24, 31.0% from 25 to 44, 25.2% from 45 to 64, and 11.8% who were 65 years of age or older.  The median age was 38 years. For every 100 females, there were 94.1 males.  For every 100 females age 18 and over, there were 92.2 males.

The median income for a household in the CDP was $48,272, and the median income for a family was $59,342. Males had a median income of $44,232 versus $34,661 for females. The per capita income for the CDP was $24,525.  About 6.6% of families and 9.5% of the population were below the poverty line, including 9.5% of those under age 18 and 10.7% of those age 65 or over.

El Sobrante is also home to a growing Sikh population. The center of the Sikh community is the Gurdwara Sahib of El Sobrante (known for its large golden dome), which sits high in the hills above San Pablo Dam Road.

Education
The El Sobrante Library of the Contra Costa County Library is located in El Sobrante. The library opened in 1961, and in 1975 it received an expansion that doubled the facility's size.

El Sobrante is in the West Contra Costa Unified School District.

Schools in El Sobrante include Juan Crespi Middle School, named after Juan Crespí, the Catalyst Academy, East Bay Waldorf School, and Sheldon Elementary School.

In popular culture
According to Les Claypool in his 1996 song "El Sobrante Fortnight", an El Sobrante fortnight is "somewhere between two weeks and a decade". Former Green Day drummer John Kiffmeyer took his stage name, "Al Sobrante", from the town. The band Jawbreaker references El Sobrante as "El Sob" in their song "Boxcar".

Notable residents

 Musicians such as Kirk Hammett of Metallica and Exodus, Marc Biederman of Blind Illusion, Les Claypool (former member of Blind Illusion currently of Primus), Larry "Ler" LaLonde of Primus and Possessed, Jason Beebout of Samiam and Isocracy and John Kiffmeyer (known professionally as Al Sobrante) of Green Day and Isocracy all grew up in El Sobrante, and most of them attended De Anza High School.  Many of these musicians have close ties. Hammett and Claypool were friends as children. LaLonde was a founding member of death metal pioneers Possessed, who toured with Metallica before joining Claypool in Primus, and Claypool auditioned to join Metallica; however Claypool was turned down because his style was too funky for Metallica.

El Sobrante has been the home of many notable comic book artists, such as underground Joel Beck, who grew up in El Sobrante and attended De Anza High School, and his friend Roger Brand, who assisted legendary comics artists Gil Kane and Wally Wood. Later comics creators to come out of El Sobrante include New York Times Bestselling author Landry Walker, a student of De Anza High School who went on to work on Batman, Supergirl, The Incredibles, and Star Wars comics. DC and Image Comics artist Eric Jones who grew up in El Sobrante as well, but attended Salesian High School. In the 1990s, Star Wars comics artist Chris Fenoglio was raised in El Sobrante.

Other notable residents include artist's model Flo Allen, who died while living in El Sobrante. As well as pioneering hypertext author Judy Malloy who lived in El Sobrante from 1995 to 2013, and wrote much of her work while living there.

See also

 Garrity Creek
 San Pablo Creek

References

External links

Bay Area Storytelling Festival  Annual storytelling festival in May
Gurdwara Sahib Temple
El Sobrante Chamber of Commerce

 
Census-designated places in Contra Costa County, California
Census-designated places in California